Florent "Flo" Bojaj (born 13 April 1996) is a professional footballer who plays as a midfielder for Hemel Hempstead Town. Born in England, he has represented Albania at youth international level.

Early life
Bojaj was born in London, England to Kosovo Albanian parents from Kosovo.

Club career

Youth career
Flo Bojaj started his youth career with Oxhey Wanderers in the West Herts County League, where he was spotted by manager Andrew Hood while playing for his school.

Bojaj went on to play for Boreham Wood, before signing for Huddersfield in 2013.

Huddersfield Town
Bojaj made several appearances for the Huddersfield Town Under-18s and Under-21s as both teams won their respective league titles for consecutive seasons.

On 29 October 2015, he signed a contract with the Terriers until 2017 – with the club having the option of an extra year.

After being named on the bench for a few games, Bojaj made his professional debut as a late substitute in Town's 2–0 win over Milton Keynes Dons, where he set up the second goal for Jamie Paterson. On 8 March 2016, Bojaj scored his first goal for Huddersfield, contributing the third in a 3–1 win over Reading.

He was released at the end of the 2016–17 season.

Kilmarnock (loan)
On 1 July 2016, Bojaj was loaned out to Kilmarnock. He made his debut two weeks later in a Scottish League Cup match against Clyde.

Newport County (loan)
On 10 January 2017, he joined Newport County on loan. He made his only appearance for Newport in a League Two match against Colchester United as a 75th minute substitute on 14 January.

Welling United
After a trial with St Albans City in the pre-season, Bojaj completed a move to National League South side Welling United on 8 September 2017.

On 11 October, it was announced that Bojaj had left the club by mutual consent after making three appearances.

Walton & Hersham 
Upon his departure, he joined Combined Counties Premier Division club Walton & Hersham.

On 14 October, Bojaj made his debut in a 2–0 league win at Horley Town. He scored the first goal and won the penalty for the second.

The following month, he scored his first hat-trick in a 9–1 win against Banstead Athletic.

Etar
On 17 July 2018, Bojaj signed with Bulgarian club Etar for two years.

International career 
On 21 February 2012, Bojaj making his debut with Albania U17 in a friendly match against Slovenia U17. He came on as a substitute at 65th minute in place of Maldin Ymeraj.

In May 2016, after Kosovo was officially recognized by UEFA and FIFA. Bojaj declared that he was interested in representing Kosovo.

Career statistics

References

External links

1996 births
Living people
Footballers from Greater London
Kosovo Albanians
Association football forwards
Albanian footballers
Albania youth international footballers
Kosovan footballers
Huddersfield Town A.F.C. players
Kilmarnock F.C. players
Newport County A.F.C. players
Welling United F.C. players
Walton & Hersham F.C. players
OFC Pirin Blagoevgrad players
SFC Etar Veliko Tarnovo players
English Football League players
Scottish Professional Football League players
First Professional Football League (Bulgaria) players
Albanian expatriate footballers
Kosovan expatriate footballers
Expatriate footballers in Bulgaria
Albanian expatriate sportspeople in Bulgaria
Hemel Hempstead Town F.C. players